Bolęcin may refer to the following places:
Bolęcin, Lesser Poland Voivodeship (south Poland)
Bolęcin, Płońsk County in Masovian Voivodeship (east-central Poland)
Bolęcin, Przysucha County in Masovian Voivodeship (east-central Poland)